Julian Houghton (16 February 1931 – 6 October 2004) was a New Zealand cricketer. He played in three first-class matches for Central Districts in 1953/54.

See also
 List of Central Districts representative cricketers

References

External links
 

1931 births
2004 deaths
New Zealand cricketers
Central Districts cricketers
Cricketers from Christchurch